Allison Island is an island within the city of Miami Beach in Miami-Dade County, Florida, United States.  It is located inside the Indian Creek waterway in the La Gorce neighborhood, in the area of the city referred to as North Beach.

References

Islands of Miami Beach, Florida